The Men's team pursuit race of the 2016 World Single Distances Speed Skating Championships was held on 12 February 2016.

Results
The race was started at 20:28.

References

Men's team pursuit